Louis Alexander Fagan (7 February 1845 – 5 January 1903) was an Anglo-Italian writer and artist. He worked in the Department of Prints and Drawings for the British Museum from 1869 to 1894, and wrote various books on the department. A painting of his by John Singer Sargent sold at auction for $118,750 in 2020.

Early life
Louis Alexander Fagan was born in 1845 in Naples, Italy to George Fagan and his wife Maria, their second son out of three sons and four daughters. His younger brother, Charles Edward Fagan, later became the secretary of the Natural History Department at the British Museum. In 1860, he was sent to England by a Queen's Messenger and was taken care of by Sir Anthony Panizzi, a friend of his father's who he would later write a biography on.

Career 
In 1869, Fagan began working at the Department of Prints and Drawings at the British Museum and in 1875, he was recorded to have a salary of £215 (£32,000 in today's money) for his role "act[ing] as Assistant Keeper in the Print Room." 1881, Thom's Irish Almanac and Official Directory of the United Kingdom of Great Britain and Ireland listed him as "Assistant, Second Class...(acting Assistant Keeper) in the  In 1882, the Post Office London Directory, 1882 recorded him as the same. 

In 1893, John Singer Sargent painted a 30.25x25.125 inch oil on canvas portrait of Fagan, which was sold in 2020 at Doyle's for $118, 750

In his lifetime he wrote 92 articles for the original 1985-1900 Dictionary of National Biography.

Death 
He retired in 1894 from ill health, and on 5 January 1903, he died in Florence. His painting was donated by his wife to the Reform Club in 1911.

Family
On 8 November 1887, he married Caroline Frances Purves.

Literary Works

English 
Handbook to the Department of Prints and Drawings in the British Museum (1876)

The Life of Sir Anthony Panizzi, K.C.B (1881) in 2 vols.

The Art of Michel' Angelo Buonarroti as Illustrated by the Various Collections in the British Museum (1883)

Collectors' Marks (1183)

A Catalogue Raisonné of the Engraved Works of William Woollett (1885)

1836-1886. The Reform Club: Its Founders and Architect (1887)

A Descriptive Catalogue of the Engraved Works of William Faithorne (1888)

An easy walk through the British museum, or, How to see it in a few hours (1891)

Italian 
Vita di Michelangelo Buonarroti. Catalogo dei disegni, sculture [&c.] di Michelangelo Buonarroti esistenti in Inghilterra, compilato da L. Fagan (1875)

Lettere ad Antonio Panizzi di uomini illustri e di amici italiani, 1823-1870 (1880)

Contributions to other Literary Works 
He edited Letters of Prosper Merimée to Panizzi (1881) in 2 vols. as well as their French and Italian counterparts. He also translated The Masters of Raffaello (Raphael Sanzio) (1882) by Marco Minghetti into English.

Artwork

Notes

Reference

External links
 
 

1845 births
1903 deaths
19th-century British writers
Employees of the British Museum
19th-century Neapolitan people